Events from the year 1842 in Scotland.

Incumbents

Law officers 
 Lord Advocate – Sir William Rae, Bt until October; then Duncan McNeill
 Solicitor General for Scotland – Duncan McNeill; then Adam Anderson

Judiciary 
 Lord President of the Court of Session and Lord Justice General – Lord Boyle
 Lord Justice Clerk – Lord Hope

Events 
 3 January – 3rd Scottish Convention of Chartists opens in Glasgow.
 21 February – Edinburgh and Glasgow Railway opened.
 29 April – New Market opened in Aberdeen.
 May – the General Assembly of the Church of Scotland makes a "Claim of Rights" (drafted by Alexander Colquhoun-Stirling-Murray-Dunlop) asserting the church's independence of state control in spiritual matters.
 1 September – Queen Victoria arrives by sea at Granton, Edinburgh, to start her first visit to Scotland.
 September – Robert Davidson's experimental battery-electric locomotive Galvani is demonstrated on the Edinburgh and Glasgow Railway.
 The Sobieski Stuarts' Vestiarium Scoticum is published in Edinburgh, purporting to be a reproduction from an old manuscript illustrating traditional Scottish clan tartan dress.
 A velocipede rider from Dumfriesshire, perhaps Kirkpatrick Macmillan, knocks down a pedestrian in the Gorbals district of Glasgow.
 James Shanks patents and begins to produce the pony-drawn lawn mower.
 Glasgow Botanic Gardens moves to its current location.
 Carnoustie Golf Links opened.

Births 
 16 April – Laidlaw Purves, surgeon and golfer (died 1917 in England)
 1 May – David Boyle, archaeologist in Canada (died 1911)
 27 June – Jamie Anderson, golfer (died 1905)
 20 September – James Dewar chemist and physicist (died 1923)
 12 October – Robert Gillespie Reid, railway contractor in Canada (died 1908)

Deaths 
 28 April – Charles Bell, surgeon, anatomist, neurologist and philosophical theologian (born 1774)
 31 May – James Fergusson, judge (born 1769)
 12 December – Robert Haldane, theologian (born 1764 in London)
 24 December – Adam Gillies, Lord Gillies, judge (born 1760)

See also 

 Timeline of Scottish history
 1842 in the United Kingdom

References 

 
Scotland
1840s in Scotland